Tal Wilkenfeld (born 2 December 1986) is an Australian singer, songwriter, bassist, and guitarist. She has performed with artists including Jeff Beck, Prince, Incubus, Eric Clapton, Herbie Hancock, and Mick Jagger. In 2008, Wilkenfeld was voted "The Year's Most Exciting New Player" by Bass Player magazine readers' choice poll. In 2013, Wilkenfeld was awarded Bass Player Magazine's "Young Gun Award" by Don Was, where she performed "Chelsea Hotel" by Leonard Cohen.

Wilkenfeld is a bandleader of her own eponymous bands, in which she sings, plays bass, and plays guitar. In her earlier work, she was backed by musicians such as Wayne Krantz and Vinnie Colaiuta. She opened for The Who on the North American part of The Who Hits 50! tour in 2016. In 2016, Wilkenfeld released a single entitled "Corner Painter" which features Blake Mills and Benmont Tench. Also in 2016, Rolling Stone stated that Wilkenfeld was "working on new music that sees her evolving from an instrumental prodigy into a formidable singer-songwriter." On 15 March 2019, Wilkenfeld released her vocal debut album Love Remains, which reached No. 1 on the Billboard Heatseeker charts on the first week of its release. Love Remains has been highly praised by the press and featured in Rolling Stone, Relix, Paste, Billboard, and Forbes. Rolling Stone described Wilkenfeld's vocal debut as "ten dense, riff-heavy tracks with brazen, introspective lyrics—prove her songwriting abilities." Wilkenfeld has also been a guest on popular podcasts, including WTF with Marc Maron, and Bill Burr's Monday Morning Podcast .

Wilkenfeld has recorded on projects with Ringo Starr, Brian Wilson, Toto, Todd Rundgren, Macy Gray, Dr. John, Trevor Rabin, Jackson Browne, Joe Walsh, Rod Stewart, John Mayer, Sting, Ben Harper, David Gilmour, Pharrell, Buddy Guy, Billy Gibbons, Lee Ritenour, Hiram Bullock, Susan Tedeschi, and Hans Zimmer.

Early life
Born in Bondi, New South Wales, Wilkenfeld began playing guitar in 2000 when she was 14 years old. Two years later, she dropped out of high school and emigrated to the United States, where she studied electric guitar. Within a year, Wilkenfeld switched to electric bass. In 2004, Wilkenfeld graduated from Los Angeles College of Music. She accepted an endorsement from Sadowsky Guitars, and devoted herself to forming a band and composing songs. At the age of 18, Wilkenfeld moved to New York City, and began making a name for herself in New York's jazz clubs. "I was actually walking around to like several clubs every night till the sun came up, sitting in at jazz clubs just learning. I was really the only one that would go into these clubs with an electric bass, because these were like, you know, places that played exclusively bebop. So I got some funny looks for quite some time. But it was a priceless education."

Early career
While playing at a club in New York in 2006, Wilkenfeld met some members of The Allman Brothers Band. She credits Oteil Burbridge and Derek Trucks with encouraging her to join them at the Beacon Theatre, her first time on a large stage. "Oteil just handed me his bass at the beginning of "Elizabeth Reed" and literally just ran into the audience and was watching me in the audience, smiling." The jam lasted about 40 minutes and Wilkenfeld sent a recording of the performance to Jeff Beck when she auditioned for his band.

In 2006, months after performing as a guest with The Allman Brothers Band, Wilkenfeld recorded her debut album, Transformation, in just two days. Wilkenfeld composed, produced, arranged and played bass on seven songs with Wayne Krantz, Geoffrey Keezer, saxophonist Seamus Blake and Keith Carlock.

Professional bass playing career

Upon learning that Chick Corea was seeking a bassist for an upcoming tour, Wilkenfeld sent him demos of Transformation, and was selected for his 2007 Australian tour, along with Frank Gambale and Antonio Sanchez. A few months later, she joined Jeff Beck, Vinnie Colaiuta, and Jason Rebello for Beck's summer European tour. The group completed their tour at Eric Clapton's 2007 Crossroads Guitar Festival in Chicago, Illinois, performing to a sell-out crowd of approximately 40,000 people. By November 2007, Wilkenfeld had rejoined Beck and the other band members for a week-long residency at Ronnie Scott's Jazz Club in London. Beck selected that venue to record a new DVD and CD, with guests that included Clapton, Joss Stone, and Imogen Heap. It was recorded, filmed, and released as Live at Ronnie Scott's. On the same trip, Wilkenfeld joined Herbie Hancock, Wayne Shorter, singer Corinne Bailey Rae, and drummer Vinnie Colaiuta on a session filmed for the A&E series, Live from Abbey Road. Wilkenfeld completed 2007 with two standing-room-only Greenwich Village shows with Krantz.

 
In 2008, Wilkenfeld accompanied Krantz at shows in Los Angeles, before an Australian tour with Krantz and Carlock, a reunion of the band that appeared on Transformation. At the conclusion of the tour, Krantz, Carlock and John Beasley backed Wilkenfeld during her headlining set for Bass Player LIVE! 2008 in Los Angeles. In July, she accompanied Jeff Beck in a tribute to George Martin in Los Angeles. She appeared at Warren Haynes's 20th Annual Christmas Jam, reuniting and performing with The Allman Brothers Band and guesting with Gov't Mule, Ivan Neville, and Robben Ford.

In 2008, Wilkenfeld received a phone call from Prince. She was surprised that his first words to her were, "Do you like the drum rolls of Jack DeJohnette?" 
 
Prince brought Wilkenfeld to parties at his Los Angeles home. Sometimes he and his band played and she was their lone audience member.

Months later, Prince called Wilkenfeld from Minneapolis, and said that he wanted to put together a trio with her, asking Wilkenfeld to find them a drummer. They settled on Chris Coleman, who had been playing with Chaka Khan and Rachelle Farrell, and Prince flew the two musicians to Paisley Park for the first time in late 2009.
In March 2010, Wilkenfeld travelled to Paisley Park, and began to improvise and play chords on instruction from Prince. "I just made everything up; he gave me no direction about what to play beyond a chord here or there. It was just do your thing", Wilkenfeld explained. "I never heard the lyrics, never knew what the songs were about, never heard the melody. It was like we had to be psychic when we were playing", she added. The result of this work culminated in Welcome 2 America - Prince's 2021 album and first posthumous release with previously unreleased music, which features Wilkenfeld on bass on 10 of the 12 tracks, recorded in 2010.
 
"Prince also had two listening parties around May 2010 after we tracked. He was so excited to be playing us fully mixed tracks. He was definitely into the music. People were pulling up in limos dressed in Grammy attire," said Wilkenfeld It is unknown why the album was shelved for 11 years. Even a decade later, those who worked on the album still do not understand why.

Prince premiered his song "Hot Summer" featuring Wilkenfeld on Minnesota Public Radio station 89.3 on 7 June 2010.

In 2009, Wilkenfeld toured Australia and Japan with Jeff Beck, who referred to her as a genius, saying "She will pick up mistakes that...Vinnie and I miss. So, she's a great anchor as well." Weeks later, the group toured the United States, beginning with Beck's induction into the Rock and Roll Hall of Fame where they played Beck's Bolero and were joined by Led Zeppelin's Jimmy Page on Immigrant Song.

A DVD of this performance, Rock and Roll Hall of Fame: Legends,tv was released in 2010.

Between touring Japan and America, Wilkenfeld performed with The Roots on Late Night with Jimmy Fallon as their first musical guest, after which she joined Jeff Beck's summer tour through Europe, Canada and the UK. Pink Floyd's David Gilmour sat in with the group during a performance at the Royal Albert Hall.

In October 2009, Wilkenfeld reunited with Beck at Madison Square Garden for the Rock and Roll Hall of Fame's 25th Anniversary two-night concert. The set included Buddy Guy on "Let Me Love You Baby", Sting singing "People Get Ready", and Billy Gibbons on "Foxey Lady". The 25th Anniversary Rock and Roll Hall of Fame Concerts DVD, which also included "Big Block", "A Day in the Life", and "Freeway Jam", was released in 2010.

Wilkenfeld was featured on four tracks on Jeff Beck's album Emotion & Commotion.

In 2010, Wilkenfeld contributed to Hancock's The Imagine Project on "A Change is Gonna Come" and "Don't Give Up" She played on Macy Gray's The Sellout on "That Man" and on Lee Ritenour's Six String Theory on "68", "In your Dreams", "Give Me One Reason" and Guthrie Govan's song "Fives".

In 2010, Wilkenfeld appeared in The Baked Potato's 40th anniversary show at the Ford Amphitheater with Steve Lukather's band, and accompanied Hancock across the US, Canada, and Europe to promote a new release on which she had played. The tour included a show at Carnegie Hall to celebrate Hancock's 70th birthday.

In September 2011, Wilkenfeld accompanied Steven Tyler and Jeff Beck at the iHeartRadio Music Festival at the MGM Grand Garden Arena. Sting, who also accompanied Tyler on a song, recalled in a 2017 interview with Bass Player that Wilkenfeld had corrected him on an Aerosmith song. "I really respected her courage to come up to me and teach me the right way to play the part, and I was very grateful. She's an amazing bassist with great ears."

On 19 May 2012, Wilkenfeld accompanied Beck and Mick Jagger on Saturday Night Live.

In 2013, Wilkenfeld joined alt-country singer-songwriter Ryan Adams as a collaborator on his studio album, Ryan Adams (2014). She contributed to two tracks on the Toto album Toto XIV, and co-wrote a song called "Running Whiskey" with ZZ Top guitarist Billy Gibbons. "Running Whiskey" was released in 2016 by Supersonic Blues Machine.

In 2018, Wilkenfeld performed with Bob Weir and his band Wolf Bros at the Arlington Theatre in Santa Barbara, and the Beacon Theatre in Manhattan.

Wilkenfeld was featured on the cover of Bass Player magazine's March 2019 issue. On 22 July 2019, Wilkenfeld appeared on Jimmy Kimmel Live!, performing "Killing Me" and "Corner Painter".

In January 2023, When Jeff Beck passed away, Wilkenfeld shared her closeness with Beck "You treated me like a daughter to the point where Wikipedia actually thought that was true. Actually, I did too."

In January and February 2023, Wilkenfeld played 5 shows with Incubus while their bassist Ben Kenney recovered from brain surgery

Solo career
On 3 March 2016, Wilkenfeld released a single, "Corner Painter", which featured Blake Mills and Benmont Tench. On 15 March 2017, Judd Apatow featured "Corner Painter" on season two of his Netflix series Love.

Wilkenfeld opened for The Who on the North American part of The Who Hits 50! tour, starting in Detroit on 27 February 2016. Wilkenfeld headlined on her own between The Who dates, starting in Toronto, Ontario on 29 February 2016.

On 14 December 2018, Wilkenfeld released a song entitled "Under The Sun". In 2019, Billboard magazine premiered her new single "Killing Me". Wilkenfeld released her debut vocal album Love Remains on 15 March 2019. The album includes Blake Mills on guitar, Benmont Tench on keyboard, and Jackson Browne as executive producer. Love Remains reached No. 1 on the Billboard Heatseeker charts on the first week of its release.

Personal life

Wilkenfeld practices meditation. "I'm very focused on my spiritual, emotional, and mental growth" she told Rolling Stone. "I meditate every day, and I just want to continue to evolve as a person, and I hope that my music will reflect that." She elaborated with Popdust, stating that "Meditating helps creativity flow. The more you meditate, the more you realize that everything is a meditation. The silence is important." When Bass Player magazine asked about her time working with Herbie Hancock and Wayne Shorter, Wilkenfeld said: "It's comforting to know that two of the greatest musicians alive are just as focused on their spiritual paths as their musical paths, and for them, they're one and the same. I remember standing at the side of the stage a few minutes before I was going to play with Wayne, and he came up to me and said, "Play eternity!" Leonard Cohen, who I was lucky enough to spend time with, was also deeply focused on his spiritual journey. Self-inquiry is a very important part of my life, and it's reassuring to meet other like-minded people."

Wilkenfeld states that stand-up comedy is one of her favorite forms of entertainment.
She has appeared on several comedians' podcasts, promoting her album Love Remains, from Marc Maron, Bill Burr, and twice on Jeff Ross's podcast, once with Dave Attell. She co-wrote and produced a song for Marc Maron named "New Boots" for a movie titled Sword of Trust.

Wilkenfeld is Jewish.

Equipment
Wilkenfeld endorses Sadowsky bass guitars and strings, EBS Professional Bass Equipment amplifiers, cabinets, and effect pedals.

Discography

Solo artist
 Albums
 2007 - Transformation
 2019 - Love Remains

 Singles
 2016 - Corner Painter
 2018 - Under the Sun
 2019 - Killing Me

With Jeff Beck
 2007 - Eric Clapton's Crossroads Guitar Festival, Wilkenfeld with Jeff Beck on "Cause We've Ended as Lovers" and "Big Block".
 2008 - Live at Ronnie Scott's, Jeff Beck
 2010 - Emotion & Commotion, Jeff Beck 
 2010 - The 25th Anniversary Rock & Roll Hall of Fame Concerts, featuring Wilkenfeld with Jeff Beck, Sting, Buddy Guy, and Billy Gibbons.
 2010 - Rock and Roll Hall of Fame + Museum Live Legends DVD, featuring Wilkenfeld with Jeff Beck and Jimmy Page.
 2013 - Eric Clapton's Crossroads Guitar Festival

With Herbie Hancock
 2010 - The Imagine Project, Herbie Hancock CD
 2013 - Experience Montreux, Herbie Hancock Blu-ray 3D

With Macy Gray
 2010 - The Sellout, Macy Gray CD, Wilkenfeld performs on the track "That Man"

With Lee Ritenour
 2010 - 6 String Theory, Lee Ritenour
 2012 - Rhythm Sessions, Lee Ritenour

With Jackson Browne
 2012 - Chimes of Freedom: The Songs of Bob Dylan Honoring 50 Years of Amnesty International, on "Love Minus Zero/No Limit", with Jackson Browne, Benmont Tench, Jonathan Wilson, and Jim Keltner
 2014 - Standing in the Breach

With Trevor Rabin
 2012 - Jacaranda, Trevor Rabin

With Wayne Krantz
 2012 - Howie 61, Wayne Krantz

With Steve Lukather
 2013 - Transition, Steve Lukather

With Ryan Adams
 2014 - Ryan Adams, Ryan Adams

With Toto
 2015 - Toto XIV, Toto

With Todd Rundgren
 2015 - Global, Todd Rundgren

With Keith Urban
 2016 - Ripcord, Keith Urban CD, on the track "Break on Me"

With Prince
 2021 - Welcome 2 America, Prince CD - recorded in 2010

DVD and Blu-ray

With Jeff Beck
 2007 - Eric Clapton's Crossroads Guitar Festival DVD, Wilkenfeld with Jeff Beck on "Cause We've Ended as Lovers" and "Big Block".
 2008 - Live at Ronnie Scott's, Jeff Beck DVD and Blu-ray
 2010 - The 25th Anniversary Rock & Roll Hall of Fame Concerts DVD, featuring Wilkenfeld with Jeff Beck, Sting, Buddy Guy, and Billy Gibbons.
 2010 - Rock and Roll Hall of Fame + Museum Live Legends DVD, featuring Wilkenfeld with Jeff Beck and Jimmy Page.
 2013 - Eric Clapton's Crossroads Guitar Festival DVD and Blu-ray
 2018 - Still on the Run (Jeff Beck DVD) Jeff Beck DVD

References

Further reading
 Irvine, Nicole (July 8–10, 2016). "Moving Beyond Prodigy". Metro Ottawa. p. BF10.
 King, Pat (May 24–27, 2019). "Tal Wilkenfeld on Learning From the Greats and Finding Her Own Voice". Metro New York. pp. 10–11.

External links

Living people
Musicians from Sydney
21st-century bass guitarists
Australian bass guitarists
Australian women guitarists
Jazz fusion musicians
Women bass guitarists
1986 births
Jazz fusion bass guitarists
Australian session musicians
Australian singer-songwriters
Australian Jews
21st-century guitarists
Guitarists from Los Angeles
21st-century women musicians
21st-century Australian singers
21st-century Australian women singers
Australian women singer-songwriters